Juan Orellana (born 1 May 1997) is an Argentine professional footballer who plays as a defender for San Martín de Tucumán.

Career
Orellana began in the ranks of San Martín, signing for their academy in early 2017. He was promoted into their senior side during the 2018–19 Primera División campaign, though made his senior bow in the Copa Argentina on 6 March 2019 during a penalty shoot-out victory over Agropecuario of Primera B Nacional. He went on to make three league appearances in 2018–19, as they suffered relegation.

Personal life
In August 2020, it was confirmed that Orellana had tested positive for COVID-19 amid the pandemic; he was asymptomatic.

Career statistics
.

References

External links

1997 births
Living people
Sportspeople from Tucumán Province
Argentine footballers
Association football defenders
Argentine Primera División players
San Martín de Tucumán footballers